Hermann Obrecht (26 March 1882 – 21 August 1940) was a Swiss politician and member of the Swiss Federal Council (1935–1940).

He was elected to the Swiss Federal Council on 4 April 1935 and handed over office on 31 July 1940. He was affiliated to the Radical Democratic Party. During his time in office he headed up the Federal Department of Economic Affairs.

External links

1882 births
1940 deaths
People from the canton of Solothurn
Swiss Calvinist and Reformed Christians
Free Democratic Party of Switzerland politicians
Members of the Federal Council (Switzerland)
Members of the National Council (Switzerland)
World War II political leaders